The works of American author Edgar Allan Poe (January 19, 1809 – October 7, 1849) include many poems, short stories, and one novel. His fiction spans multiple genres, including horror fiction, adventure, science fiction, and detective fiction, a genre he is credited with inventing. These works are generally considered part of the Dark romanticism movement, a literary reaction to Transcendentalism. Poe's writing reflects his literary theories: he disagreed with didacticism and allegory. Meaning in literature, he said in his criticism, should be an undercurrent just beneath the surface; works whose meanings are too obvious cease to be art. Poe pursued originality in his works, and disliked proverbs. He often included elements of popular pseudosciences such as phrenology and physiognomy. His most recurring themes deal with questions of death, including its physical signs, the effects of decomposition, concerns of premature burial, the reanimation of the dead, and mourning. Though known as a masterly practitioner of Gothic fiction, Poe did not invent the genre; he was following a long-standing popular tradition.

Poe's literary career began in 1827 with the release of 50 copies of Tamerlane and Other Poems credited only to "a Bostonian", a collection of early poems that received virtually no attention. In December 1829, Poe released Al Aaraaf, Tamerlane, and Minor Poems in Baltimore before delving into short stories for the first time with "Metzengerstein" in 1832. His most successful and most widely read prose during his lifetime was "The Gold-Bug", which earned him a $100 prize, the most money he received for a single work. One of his most important works, "The Murders in the Rue Morgue", was published in 1841 and is today considered the first modern detective story. Poe called it a "tale of ratiocination". Poe became a household name with the publication of "The Raven" in 1845, though it was not a financial success. The publishing industry at the time was a difficult career choice and much of Poe's work was written using themes specifically catered for mass market tastes.

Poetry

Tales

Other works

Essays

 "Maelzel's Chess Player" (April 1836 – Southern Literary Messenger)
 "The Philosophy of Furniture" (May 1840 – Burton's Gentleman's Magazine)
 "A Few Words on Secret Writing" (July 1841 – Graham's Magazine)
 "Morning on the Wissahiccon" (1844 – The Opal)
 "The Balloon-Hoax" (April 13, 1844) – A newspaper article that was actually a journalistic hoax
 "The Philosophy of Composition" (April 1846 – Graham's Magazine)
 "Eureka: A Prose Poem" (March 1848 – Wiley & Putnam)
 "The Rationale of Verse" (October 1848 – Southern Literary Messenger)
 "The Poetic Principle" (December 1848 – Southern Literary Messenger)

Novels
 The Narrative of Arthur Gordon Pym of Nantucket (First two installments, January/February 1837 – Southern Literary Messenger, issued as complete novel in July 1838)
 The Journal of Julius Rodman (First six installments, January–June 1840 – Burton's Gentleman's Magazine) – Incomplete

Plays
 Politian (Two installments, December 1835–January 1836 – Southern Literary Messenger) – Incomplete

Other
 Tales of the Folio Club – A projected collection of Poe's tales on "dunderism" satirizing the Delphian Club which was never completed in his lifetime
 The Philosophy of Animal Magnetism – A pamphlet on Mesmerism credited to a "Gentleman of Philadelphia" (1837), attributed to Poe using stylometry 
 The Conchologist's First Book (1839) – A textbook on sea shells produced by Poe as a condensed version of a textbook by Thomas Wyatt
 The Light-House (1849, never published in Poe's lifetime) – An incomplete work that may have been intended to be a short story or a novel

Collections

This list of collections refers only to those printed during Poe's lifetime with his permission. Modern anthologies are not included.
 Tamerlane and Other Poems (credited by "a Bostonian") (1827)
 Al Aaraaf, Tamerlane and Minor Poems (1829)
 Poems (1831, printed as "second edition")
 Tales of the Grotesque and Arabesque (December 1839)
 The Prose Romances of Edgar A. Poe (1843)
 Tales (1845, Wiley & Putnam)
 The Raven and Other Poems (1845, Wiley & Putnam)

See also

American journals that Edgar Allan Poe was involved with include:
American Review: A Whig Journal
Broadway Journal
Burton's Gentleman's Magazine
Godey's Lady's Book
Graham's Magazine
Southern Literary Messenger
The Stylus

References

Notes

Sources
 
 
 
 
 
 
 
 
 
 
 
 
 
 
 
 
Sherer, Daniel. “Edgar Allan Poe's “The Philosophy of Furniture (1840),”PIN-UP Magazine 15 (Nov. 2013), 166–72.

External links

 The Works of Edgar Allan Poe at the Edgar Allan Poe Society online – includes multiple versions of fiction, essays, criticisms
 Complete list of Poe's contributions to various journals and magazines at bartleby.com
 
 
 

Bibliography
Bibliographies by writer
Bibliographies of American writers
Horror fiction bibliographies
Poetry bibliographies